Die Straßen von Berlin is a German television series.

See also
List of German television series

External links
 

German crime television series
1995 German television series debuts
2000 German television series endings
Television shows set in Berlin
German-language television shows
ProSieben original programming